Kvævemoen Church is a parish church of the Church of Norway in the large Sirdal Municipality in Agder county, Norway. It is located in the village of Kvæven. It one of the four churches in the Sirdal parish which is part of the Lister og Mandal prosti (deanery) in the Diocese of Agder og Telemark. The brown, wooden church was built in a long church design in 1962 using plans drawn up by the architect Valdemar Scheel Hansteen. The church seats about 100 people.

History
Work on the church began on 9 May 1960 when the foundation stone was laid by the Bishop of Stavanger, Karl Marthinussen. The church was consecrated on 31 May 1962. There is room for about 100 people in the main sanctuary. Downstairs, there is a dining room, kitchen, cloakroom, and bathroom.

See also
List of churches in Agder og Telemark

References

Sirdal
Churches in Agder
Wooden churches in Norway
20th-century Church of Norway church buildings
Churches completed in 1962
1962 establishments in Norway